James Hankinson (1 July 1928 – June 2016) was an English footballer, who played as an inside forward in the Football League for Chester. He was on the books of Preston North End without playing league football for them, and previously played for non-league club Lancaster City.

References

1928 births
2016 deaths
Footballers from Preston, Lancashire
English footballers
Association football inside forwards
Lancaster City F.C. players
Preston North End F.C. players
Chester City F.C. players
English Football League players